Jorge Luis Córdova Díaz (April 20, 1907 – September 16, 1994) served as Puerto Rico's eleventh Resident Commissioner.  His father, Félix Córdova Dávila, had served as Puerto Rico's fourth Resident Commissioner from 1917 to 1932.

Born in Manatí, Puerto Rico, Córdova was a 1924 graduate of St. John's College High School in Washington, DC. He attained his A.B. in 1928 from Catholic University of America, 
and his LL.B. in 1931 from Harvard Law School in Cambridge, Massachusetts.  He was a lawyer in private practice.  He served as a Superior Court judge in San Juan from 1940 to 1945.  He served as an associate justice of the Supreme Court of Puerto Rico from 1945 to 1946.

Córdova was unexpectedly elected, as the New Progressive Party candidate for Resident Commissioner, for a four-year term (1969–1973) that spanned the Ninety-First and Ninety-Second Congress.  His victory as gubernatorial candidate Luis A. Ferré's running mate, was unexpected since the Popular Democratic Party had ruled Puerto Rico for 28 consecutive years.  Although a Republican, he sat with the Democrats in caucus.  He was an unsuccessful candidate for reelection in 1972, and became a business executive.

Prior to Córdova's death, then-Senator Kenneth McClintock authored legislation, signed by Governor Pedro Rosselló, that created the Córdova Congressional Internship Program honoring Córdova Díaz and his father and Congressional predecessor, Félix Córdova Dávila.  The program allows 40 college students to spend a semester-long internship in the United States Congress every year.  Since its inception, over 600 students have participated in the program which is run by The Washington Center for Academic Internships and Scholarships and a joint committee of Puerto Rico's Legislative Assembly, chaired for many years by McClintock and currently chaired by senator Melinda Romero Donnelly.

He died on September 16, 1994, at his home Guaynabo, Puerto Rico at the age of 87.

See also

List of Puerto Ricans
List of Hispanic Americans in the United States Congress

Notes

Sources

http://www.oslpr.org
http://www.twc.org

|-

1907 births
1994 deaths
20th-century American judges
20th-century American politicians
Associate Justices of the Supreme Court of Puerto Rico
Catholic University of America alumni
Democratic Party members of the United States House of Representatives from Puerto Rico
Harvard Law School alumni
People from Manatí, Puerto Rico
Republican Party members of the United States House of Representatives from Puerto Rico
Resident Commissioners of Puerto Rico